No One Sings Like You Anymore, Vol. 1 is the fifth studio album by Chris Cornell, released posthumously without prior announcement by his estate and Universal Music Enterprises, on December 11, 2020. It consists of ten covers sequenced and recorded by Cornell in 2016, including Harry Nilsson's "Jump into the Fire", John Lennon's "Watching the Wheels", and Prince's "Nothing Compares 2 U".

The album was preceded by Cornell's cover of Guns N' Roses' "Patience", released as a single on July 20, 2020, in honor of his 56th birthday. The single became Cornell's first solo song to hit No. 1 on Billboards Mainstream Rock chart.

Cornell had also previously released "Stay with Me Baby" for the HBO series Vinyl, for which he was influenced by Terry Reid's version. Cornell's wife Vicky Cornell said in a statement: "This album is so special because it is a complete work of art that Chris created from start to finish. [...] He couldn't wait to release it."

The album's title is a line from the Soundgarden song "Black Hole Sun".

Physical versions of the album were released on March 19, 2021.

Track listing

Charts

References

2020 albums
Albums published posthumously
Chris Cornell albums
Surprise albums
Universal Music Enterprises albums
Covers albums